House of Strangers is a 1949 American film noir directed by Joseph L. Mankiewicz and starring Edward G. Robinson, Susan Hayward, and Richard Conte. The screenplay by Philip Yordan and Mankiewicz (who chose to go uncredited) is the first of three film versions of Jerome Weidman's novel I'll Never Go There Any More, the others being the Spencer Tracy western Broken Lance (1954) and The Big Show (1961).

Plot
Gino Monetti is a rags-to-riches Italian-American banker in New York City whose methods result in a number of criminal charges. Three of his four grown sons, the ambitious Joe, playboy Tony, and physically imposing Pietro, unhappy at their domineering father's dismissive treatment of them, refuse to help Gino when he is put on trial for questionable business practices. Max, a lawyer, is the only son who stays loyal to his father, and he serves as Gino's attorney during the trial.

When Gino signs ownership of his bank over to his wife Theresa as a temporary protective measure, Joe persuades his mother to sign it over to him and seizes control. Gino is relegated to an early retirement with a meager monthly allowance. The three brothers conspire to send Max to jail as well. When Max tries to bribe a juror to save his father, his crime is exposed; he is disbarred and sentenced to seven years in prison. Max must leave behind Maria, the girl he had been expected to marry, and Irene, a client he fell in love with after becoming her attorney. Meanwhile, humiliated by Joe's betrayal and directionless without his bank to run, Gino's health deteriorates and he dies shortly before Max is released.

At his father's funeral, Max vows revenge on his brothers, but that night he has a change of heart when he realizes that his father had caused all the tension within the family. The three brothers are still worried about his quest for vengeance, however, and confront him. After a fight in which Max is incapacitated, Joe even goes so far as to order Pietro to throw Max off their house's balcony to his death, but in doing so, Joe insults Pietro in the same way their father always had, prompting Pietro to turn on Joe instead. Max saves Joe from Pietro's wrath by reminding Pietro that if he kills Joe, he would only be doing exactly as their father would have wanted. Max then leaves his brothers to rejoin Irene and travel to San Francisco, where they plan to start a new life together.

Cast
 Edward G. Robinson as Gino Monetti
 Susan Hayward as Irene Bennett
 Richard Conte as Max Monetti
 Luther Adler as Joe Monetti
 Paul Valentine as Pietro Monetti
 Efrem Zimbalist, Jr. as Tony Monetti
 Debra Paget as Maria Domenico
 Hope Emerson as Helena Domenico
 Esther Minciotti as Theresa Monetti, wife of Gino Monetti

Reception

Critical response
Film critic Dennis Schwartz liked the film, writing, "Joseph L. Mankiewicz stylishly helms the dark screenplay by Philip Yordan of Jerome Weidman's novel I'll Never Go There Any More ... It's a bitter psychological family drama that focuses on hatred as the family's driving force instead of love. Max is the ambivalent hero, the only one in the film who is a true film noir character, who is punished for being loyal to his father yet is someone who has rejected the ways of the old-country and its traditionalism for the ethics of the New World. Superb performances by Conte, Robinson, and Adler lift the ordinary dramatics into loftier territory."

Accolades
The film was entered into the 1949 Cannes Film Festival and Edward G. Robinson won the prize for Best Actor.

References

External links

 
 
 
 
 
 

1949 films
1949 drama films
20th Century Fox films
American black-and-white films
American drama films
1940s English-language films
Film noir
Films based on American novels
Films directed by Joseph L. Mankiewicz
Films produced by Sol C. Siegel
Films scored by Daniele Amfitheatrof
Films set in New York City
Films set in the 1930s
1940s American films